

Houston is a 1965 studio album by Dean Martin, produced by Jimmy Bowen.

Houston peaked at 11 on the Billboard 200. The title track, written by Lee Hazlewood, had appeared in the Top 40 in the summer of 1965.

The album was reissued on CD by Hip-O Records in 2009.

Reception

William Ruhlmann, on Allmusic.com, gave the album three stars out of five, commenting that in the choice of songs and arrangements on the album, producer Jimmy Bowen was "...shrewdly expanding Martin's contemporary base beyond the formula records he had made in the wake of "Everybody Loves Somebody," and doing it successfully." Ruhlmann said that the chart performance of Houston showed that Martin's comeback "...was being sustained, not diminishing", albeit helped by promotion on Martin's successful new television show.

Track listing

Personnel 
 Dean Martin – vocals
 Bill Justis - arranger, conductor
 Ed Thrasher - art direction, photography
 Artis Page - cover art
 Eddie Brackett - engineer
 Stan Cornyn - liner notes
 Jimmy Bowen - producer

References 

1965 albums
Dean Martin albums
Albums arranged by Bill Justis
Albums conducted by Bill Justis
Albums produced by Jimmy Bowen
Reprise Records albums